Kaladan Park is a multi-use stadium in Tamale, Ghana.  It used mostly for football matches and is the home stadium of Real Tamale United.  The stadium holds 5,000 people.

External links
 Ghana-pedia website - Kaladan Park

Tamale, Ghana
Football venues in Ghana